The Nakoda (also known as Stoney or  ) are an Indigenous people in Western Canada and, originally, the United States.

They used to inhabit large parts of what is now Alberta, Saskatchewan and Montana, but their reserves are now located in Alberta and in Saskatchewan, where they are scarcely differentiated from the Assiniboine. Through their language they are related to the Dakota and Lakota nations of the Great Plains and the Rocky Mountains, part of the large Sioux Nation.

The name Stoney was given them by anglophone explorers, because of their technique of using fire-heated rocks to boil broth in rawhide bowls. They are very closely related to the Assiniboine, who are also known as Stone Sioux (from ).

The Nakoda First Nation in Alberta comprises three bands: Bearspaw, Chiniki and Wesley.

The Stoney were "excluded" from Banff National Park between 1890 and 1920.  In 2010 they were officially "welcomed back".

Nakota groups 

The Nakota (Stoney) are descendants of individual bands of Dakota, Lakota and Nakota, in particular of western groups of Assiniboine, from which they spun out as an independent group at about 1744. The Stoney were divided geographically and culturally into two tribal groups or divisions with different dialects, which in turn were further divided into several bands:

Wood Stoney ( – ‘Big Woods People’, often called Swampy Ground Assiniboine, northern tribal group)
 Alexis' band (Stoney, Métis, Woodland Cree)
 Paul's band (Danezaa, Stoney, Woodland Cree, Iroquois)
Mountain Stoney ( or Hebina – ‘Rock Mountain People’, often called Strong Wood Assiniboine, Thickwood Assiniboine, southern tribal group)
 Sharphead's band (Wolf Creek Stoney or Pigeon Lake Stoney, often called Plains Assiniboine) (Stoney, Métis)
 Stoney Nakoda First Nation, Comprising the three following bands:
 Wesley's (Goodstoney's) band (Stoney, Plains Cree, Métis)
 Chiniki's band (Métis, Stoney, Plains Cree)
 Bearspaw's band (Stoney, Cree)

Treaties
Members of the Nakoda nations of Paul and Alexis signed an adhesion to Treaty 6 in 1877.

In 1877, representatives of the Nakoda Nations of Bearspaw, Chiniki and Goodstoney met with representatives of the British Crown to discuss the terms of Treaty 7. In exchange for use of traditional native lands, the Crown agreed to honour their right to self-government and an ancestral way of life. They were also promised reserve lands, 279 km2 situated along the Bow River between the Kananaskis River and the Ghost River, which became the Big Horn, Stoney and Eden Valley reserves, shared between the Bearspaw, Chiniki and Goodstoney tribes.

See also
Sioux language
Nakota
First Nations in Alberta
List of Indian reserves in Alberta

Further reading
 John Snow, Chief: These Mountains Are Our Sacred Places. The Story of the Stoney People. Univ of Toronto Press, 1977; Dundurn 1994; Fitzhenry & Whiteside 2006

Notes

 
Plains tribes
First Nations in Alberta
Native American tribes in Montana